Female tennis players who have won at least one of the four Grand Slam titles in singles. 128 women have won at least one of the 453 majors staged. They are listed here in order of their first win. Players in bold are still active.

See also
List of Grand Slam women's singles champions
Chronological list of men's Grand Slam tennis champions
List of Grand Slam women's singles finals
List of WTA Tour top-level tournament singles champions

Lists of female tennis players